The 2007 FIBA Europe Under-18 Championship Division B was an international basketball  competition held in Bulgaria in 2007.

Final ranking

1.  Belgium

2.  Ukraine

3.  Poland

4.  Montenegro

5.  Sweden

6.  Czech Republic

7.  Bosnia and Herzegovina

8.  Hungary

9.  Finland

10.  Slovakia

11.  Norway

12.  Portugal

13.  Austria

14.  Netherlands

15.  Luxembourg

16.  Ireland

17.  Denmark

18.  England

19.  Switzerland

20.  Armenia

Awards

External links
FIBA Archive

FIBA U18 European Championship Division B
2007–08 in European basketball
2007–08 in Bulgarian basketball
International youth basketball competitions hosted by Bulgaria